Ricardo Mendes Costa (born 17 January 1994 in Maia) known as Ricardinho, is a Portuguese footballer who plays for FC Porto B as a midfielder.

Football career
On 8 May 2013, Ricardinho made his professional debut with FC Porto B in a 2012–13 Segunda Liga match against Benfica B replacing Tó Zé (90th minute).

References

External links

Stats and profile at LPFP

1994 births
Living people
Portuguese footballers
Association football midfielders
Liga Portugal 2 players
FC Porto players
People from Maia, Portugal
Sportspeople from Porto District